Naziur Rahman Manzur (15 March 1948 – 6 April 2008) was a Bangladesh Jatiya Party politician, founding chairman of the party, former government minister in the cabinet of Hussain Mohammad Ershad and the first mayor (elected by commissioners) of Dhaka City Corporation.

Early life
Manzur was born on 15 March 1948 to a Bengali Muslim family known as the Taluqdars of Balia in Bhola Island, then located in the Bakerganj District of the Dominion of Pakistan's East Bengal province. His father, Bazlur Rahman Taluqdar, was a descendant of Munga Khan who arrived in Bengal from Garmsir in Afghanistan during the eighteenth century. Khan settled in the village of Saluka in greater Barisal, and his son, Shaykh Muhammad, served as a revenue officer for the Mughal emperors and earned the title of shiqdar. He received a kharija taluq in Bhola's Balia and Gazaria areas, and thus migrated from Saluka to Balia. Manzur's brother, Dr. Azizur Rahman, is a notable scientist.

Career
He was a member of the Mukti Bahini, who fought in the Bangladesh Liberation war in sector 9. In the 1980s he served as a minister in the cabinet of Hossain Mohammad Ershad and was a member of his Jatiya party In 1999 Ershad had an alliance with the Khaleda Zia led Bangladesh Nationalist party which was the opposition party. Ershad decided to quit the alliance but a fraction of Jatiya Party leaders led by Naziur Rahman Manzur decided to quite the party and remain in the alliance led by Bangladesh Nationalist Party. This fraction became the Bangladesh Jatiya Party.

Personal life
Manzur had three sons, one of whom, Andaleeve Rahman is the present chairman of the party and a former member of parliament. His second son Dr Ashikur Rahman Shanto resigned from Jatiya Party in 2013 highlighting differences with Bangladesh Jamaat-e-Islami, which remains a key party in the BNP led 20 party alliance. The third son is Wasekur Rahman Anjan.

Death
Manzur died on 6 April 2008 in BIRDEM hospital, Dhaka, Bangladesh.

References

1948 births
2008 deaths
Sheikh Mujibur Rahman family
Mayors of Dhaka
Bangladesh Jatiya Party politicians
Mukti Bahini personnel
Bangladeshi people of Afghan descent
People from Bhola District